In mathematical logic, Russell's paradox (also known as Russell's antinomy) is a set-theoretic paradox published by the British philosopher and mathematician Bertrand Russell in 1901. Russell's paradox shows that every set theory that contains an unrestricted comprehension principle leads  to contradictions. The paradox had already been discovered independently in 1899 by the German mathematician Ernst Zermelo. However, Zermelo did not publish the idea, which remained known only to David Hilbert, Edmund Husserl, and other academics at the University of Göttingen. At the end of the 1890s, Georg Cantor – considered the founder of modern set theory – had already realized that his theory would lead to a contradiction, as he told Hilbert and Richard Dedekind by letter.

According to the unrestricted comprehension principle, for any sufficiently well-defined property, there is the set of all and only the objects that have that property. Let R be the set of all sets that are not members of themselves.  If R is not a member of itself, then its definition entails that it is a member of itself; yet, if it is a member of itself, then it is not a member of itself, since it is the set of all sets that are not members of themselves. The resulting contradiction is Russell's paradox. In symbols:

Russell also showed that a version of the paradox could be derived in the axiomatic system constructed by the German philosopher and mathematician Gottlob Frege, hence undermining Frege's attempt to reduce mathematics to logic and questioning the logicist programme. Two influential ways of avoiding the paradox were both proposed in 1908: Russell's own type theory and the Zermelo set theory. In particular, Zermelo's axioms restricted the unlimited comprehension principle. With the additional contributions of Abraham Fraenkel, Zermelo set theory  developed into the now-standard Zermelo–Fraenkel set theory (commonly known as ZFC when including the axiom of choice). The main difference between Russell's and Zermelo's solution to the paradox is that Zermelo modified the axioms of set theory while maintaining a standard logical language, while Russell modified the logical language itself. The language of ZFC, with the help of Thoralf Skolem, turned out to be that of first-order logic.

Informal presentation
Most sets commonly encountered are not members of themselves. For example, consider the set of all squares in a plane. This set is not itself a square in the plane, thus it is not a member of itself. Let us call a set "normal" if it is not a member of itself, and "abnormal" if it is a member of itself. Clearly every set must be either normal or abnormal. The set of squares in the plane is normal. In contrast, the complementary set that contains everything which is not a square in the plane is itself not a square in the plane, and so it is one of its own members and is therefore abnormal.

Now we consider the set of all normal sets, R, and try to determine whether R is normal or abnormal. If R were normal, it would be contained in the set of all normal sets (itself), and therefore be abnormal; on the other hand if R were abnormal, it would not be contained in the set of all normal sets (itself), and therefore be normal. This leads to the conclusion that R is neither normal nor abnormal: Russell's paradox.

Formal presentation
The term "naive set theory" is used in various ways.  In one usage, naive set theory is a formal theory, that is formulated in a first-order language with a binary non-logical predicate , and that includes the Axiom of extensionality:

and the axiom schema of unrestricted comprehension:

for any formula  with the variable  as a free variable inside .

Then by existential instantiation (reusing the symbol ) and universal instantiation we have

a contradiction.  Therefore, this naive set theory is inconsistent.

Philosophical implications
Prior to Russell's paradox (and to other similar paradoxes discovered around the time, such as the Burali-Forti paradox), a common conception of the idea of set was the "extensional concept of set", as recounted by von Neumann and Morgenstern:

In particular, there was no distinction between sets and proper classes as collections of objects. Additionally, the existence of each of the elements of a collection was seen as sufficient for the existence of the set of said elements. However, paradoxes such as Russell's and Burali-Forti's showed the impossibility of this conception of set, by examples of collections of objects that do not form sets, despite all said objects being existent.

Set-theoretic responses
From the principle of explosion of classical logic, any proposition can be proved from a contradiction.  Therefore, the presence of contradictions like Russell's paradox in an axiomatic set theory is disastrous; since if any formula can be proven true it destroys the conventional meaning of truth and falsity.  Further, since set theory was seen as the basis for an axiomatic development of all other branches of mathematics, Russell's paradox threatened the foundations of mathematics as a whole. This motivated a great deal of research around the turn of the 20th century to develop a consistent (contradiction-free) set theory.

In 1908, Ernst Zermelo proposed an axiomatization of set theory that avoided the paradoxes of naive set theory by replacing arbitrary set comprehension with weaker existence axioms, such as his axiom of separation (Aussonderung). (Avoiding paradox was not Zermelo's original intention, but instead to document which assumptions he used in proving the well-ordering theorem.) Modifications to this axiomatic theory proposed in the 1920s by Abraham Fraenkel, Thoralf Skolem, and by Zermelo himself resulted in the axiomatic set theory called ZFC. This theory became widely accepted once Zermelo's axiom of choice ceased to be controversial, and ZFC has remained the canonical axiomatic set theory down to the present day.

ZFC does not assume that, for every property, there is a set of all things satisfying that property. Rather, it asserts that given any set X, any subset of X definable using first-order logic exists. The object R discussed above cannot be constructed as a subset of any set X, and is therefore not a set in ZFC. In some extensions of ZFC, notably in von Neumann–Bernays–Gödel set theory, objects like R are called proper classes.

ZFC is silent about types, although the cumulative hierarchy has a notion of layers that resemble types. Zermelo himself never accepted Skolem's formulation of ZFC using the language of first-order logic. As José Ferreirós notes, Zermelo insisted instead that "propositional functions (conditions or predicates) used for separating off subsets, as well as the replacement functions, can be 'entirely arbitrary''' [ganz beliebig];" the modern interpretation given to this statement is that Zermelo wanted to include higher-order quantification in order to avoid Skolem's paradox. Around 1930, Zermelo also introduced (apparently independently of von Neumann), the axiom of foundation, thus—as Ferreirós observes— "by forbidding 'circular' and 'ungrounded' sets, it [ZFC] incorporated one of the crucial motivations of TT [type theory]—the principle of the types of arguments". This 2nd order ZFC preferred by Zermelo, including axiom of foundation, allowed a rich cumulative hierarchy. Ferreirós writes that "Zermelo's 'layers' are essentially the same as the types in the contemporary versions of simple TT [type theory] offered by Gödel and Tarski. One can describe the cumulative hierarchy into which Zermelo developed his models as the universe of a cumulative TT in which transfinite types are allowed. (Once we have adopted an impredicative standpoint, abandoning the idea that classes are constructed, it is not unnatural to accept transfinite types.) Thus, simple TT and ZFC could now be regarded as systems that 'talk' essentially about the same intended objects. The main difference is that TT relies on a strong higher-order logic, while Zermelo employed second-order logic, and ZFC can also be given a first-order formulation. The first-order 'description' of the cumulative hierarchy is much weaker, as is shown by the existence of countable models (Skolem's paradox), but it enjoys some important advantages."

In ZFC, given a set A, it is possible to define a set B that consists of exactly the sets in A that are not members of themselves. B cannot be in A by the same reasoning in Russell's Paradox. This variation of Russell's paradox shows that no set contains everything.

Through the work of Zermelo and others, especially John von Neumann, the structure of what some see as the "natural" objects described by ZFC eventually became clear; they are the elements of the von Neumann universe, V, built up from the empty set by transfinitely iterating the power set operation. It is thus now possible again to reason about sets in a non-axiomatic fashion without running afoul of Russell's paradox, namely by reasoning about the elements of V. Whether it is appropriate to think of sets in this way is a point of contention among the rival points of view on the philosophy of mathematics.

Other solutions to Russell's paradox, with an underlying strategy closer to that of type theory, include Quine's New Foundations and Scott–Potter set theory. Yet another approach is to define multiple membership relation with appropriately modified comprehension scheme, as in the Double extension set theory.

History
Russell discovered the paradox in May or June 1901. By his own account in his 1919 Introduction to Mathematical Philosophy, he "attempted to discover some flaw in Cantor's proof that there is no greatest cardinal". In a 1902 letter, he announced the discovery to Gottlob Frege of the paradox in Frege's 1879 Begriffsschrift and framed the problem in terms of both logic and set theory, and in particular in terms of Frege's definition of function:

Russell would go on to cover it at length in his 1903 The Principles of Mathematics, where he repeated his first encounter with the paradox:

Russell wrote to Frege about the paradox just as Frege was preparing the second volume of his Grundgesetze der Arithmetik. Frege responded to Russell very quickly; his letter dated 22 June 1902 appeared, with van Heijenoort's commentary in Heijenoort 1967:126–127. Frege then wrote an appendix admitting to the paradox, and proposed a solution that Russell would endorse in his Principles of Mathematics, but was later considered by some to be unsatisfactory.  For his part, Russell had his work at the printers and he added an appendix on the doctrine of types.

Ernst Zermelo in his (1908) A new proof of the possibility of a well-ordering (published at the same time he published "the first axiomatic set theory") laid claim to prior discovery of the antinomy in Cantor's naive set theory. He states: "And yet, even the elementary form that Russell9 gave to the set-theoretic antinomies could have persuaded them [J. König, Jourdain, F. Bernstein] that the solution of these difficulties is not to be sought in the surrender of well-ordering but only in a suitable restriction of the notion of set". Footnote 9 is where he stakes his claim:

{{quote|91903, pp. 366–368. I had, however, discovered this antinomy myself, independently of Russell, and had communicated it prior to 1903 to  Professor Hilbert among others.}}

Frege sent a copy of his Grundgesetze der Arithmetik to Hilbert; as noted above, Frege's last volume mentioned the paradox that Russell had communicated to Frege. After receiving Frege's last volume, on 7 November 1903, Hilbert wrote a letter to Frege in which he said, referring to Russell's paradox, "I believe Dr. Zermelo discovered it three or four years ago".  A written account of Zermelo's actual argument was discovered in the Nachlass of Edmund Husserl.

In 1923, Ludwig Wittgenstein proposed to "dispose" of Russell's paradox as follows:

The reason why a function cannot be its own argument is that the sign for a function already contains the prototype of its argument, and it
cannot contain itself. For let us suppose that the function F(fx) could be its own argument: in that case there would be a proposition F(F(fx)), in which the outer function F and the inner function F must have different meanings, since the inner one has the form O(fx) and the outer one has the form Y(O(fx)). Only the letter 'F' is common to the two functions, but the letter by itself signifies nothing. This immediately becomes clear if instead of F(Fu) we write (do) : F(Ou) . Ou = Fu. That disposes of Russell's paradox. (Tractatus Logico-Philosophicus, 3.333)

Russell and Alfred North Whitehead wrote their three-volume Principia Mathematica hoping to achieve what Frege had been unable to do. They sought to banish the paradoxes of naive set theory by employing a theory of types they devised for this purpose. While they succeeded in grounding arithmetic in a fashion, it is not at all evident that they did so by purely logical means. While Principia Mathematica avoided the known paradoxes and allows the derivation of a great deal of mathematics, its system gave rise to new problems.

In any event, Kurt Gödel in 1930–31 proved that while the logic of much of Principia Mathematica, now known as first-order logic, is complete, Peano arithmetic is necessarily incomplete if it is consistent. This is very widely—though not universally—regarded as having shown the logicist program of Frege to be impossible to complete.

In 2001 A Centenary International Conference celebrating the first hundred years of Russell's paradox was held in Munich and its proceedings have been published.

Applied versions

There are some versions of this paradox that are closer to real-life situations and may be easier to understand for non-logicians. For example, the barber paradox supposes a barber who shaves all men who do not shave themselves and only men who do not shave themselves. When one thinks about whether the barber should shave himself or not, the paradox begins to emerge.

An easy refutation of the "layman's versions" such as the barber paradox seems to be that no such barber exists, or that the barber has alopecia, or is a woman, and in the latter two cases the barber doesn't shave, and so can exist without paradox. The whole point of Russell's paradox is that the answer "such a set does not exist" means the definition of the notion of set within a given theory is unsatisfactory. Note the difference between the statements "such a set does not exist" and "it is an empty set". It is like the difference between saying "There is no bucket" and saying "The bucket is empty".

A notable exception to the above may be the Grelling–Nelson paradox, in which words and meaning are the elements of the scenario rather than people and hair-cutting. Though it is easy to refute the barber's paradox by saying that such a barber does not (and cannot) exist, it is impossible to say something similar about a meaningfully defined word.

One way that the paradox has been dramatised is as follows: Suppose that every public library has to compile a catalogue of all its books. Since the catalogue is itself one of the library's books, some librarians include it in the catalogue for completeness; while others leave it out as it being one of the library's books is self-evident. Now imagine that all these catalogues are sent to the national library. Some of them include themselves in their listings, others do not. The national librarian compiles two master catalogues—one of all the catalogues that list themselves, and one of all those that don't.

The question is: should these master catalogues list themselves? The 'Catalogue of all catalogues that list themselves' is no problem. If the librarian doesn't include it in its own listing, it remains a true catalogue of those catalogues that do include themselves. If he does include it, it remains a true catalogue of those that list themselves. However, just as the librarian cannot go wrong with the first master catalogue, he is doomed to fail with the second. When it comes to the 'Catalogue of all catalogues that don't list themselves', the librarian cannot include it in its own listing, because then it would include itself, and so belong in the other catalogue, that of catalogues that do include themselves. However, if the librarian leaves it out, the catalogue is incomplete. Either way, it can never be a true master catalogue of catalogues that do not list themselves.

Applications and related topics

Russell-like paradoxes
As illustrated above for the barber paradox, Russell's paradox is not hard to extend. Take:

 A transitive verb , that can be applied to its substantive form.

Form the sentence:

The er that s all (and only those) who don't  themselves,

Sometimes the "all" is replaced by "all ers".

An example would be "paint":

The painter that paints all (and only those) that don't paint themselves.
or "elect"
The elector (representative), that elects all that don't elect themselves.

In the Season 8 episode of The Big Bang Theory, "The Skywalker Intrusion", Sheldon Cooper analyzes the song "Play That Funky Music", concluding that the lyrics present a musical example of Russell's Paradox.

Paradoxes that fall in this scheme include:

 The barber with "shave".
 The original Russell's paradox with "contain": The container (Set) that contains all (containers) that don't contain themselves.
 The Grelling–Nelson paradox with "describer": The describer (word) that describes all words, that don't describe themselves.
 Richard's paradox with "denote": The denoter (number) that denotes all denoters (numbers) that don't denote themselves. (In this paradox, all descriptions of numbers get an assigned number. The term "that denotes all denoters (numbers) that don't denote themselves" is here called Richardian.)
 "I am lying.", namely the liar paradox and Epimenides paradox, whose origins are ancient
 Russell–Myhill paradox

Related paradoxes
 The Burali-Forti paradox, about the order type of all well-orderings
 The Kleene–Rosser paradox, showing that the original lambda calculus is inconsistent, by means of a self-negating statement
 Curry's paradox (named after Haskell Curry), which does not require negation
 The smallest uninteresting integer paradox
 Girard's paradox in type theory

See also
 Basic Law V
 
 
 
 "On Denoting"
 
 Quine's paradox
 Self-reference

Notes

References

Sources

External links

Russell's Paradox at Cut-the-Knot
Russell's (Barber) paradox explanation in Python

Bertrand Russell
Paradoxes of naive set theory
1901 in science
Self-referential paradoxes